Lai Caiqin (born 5 December 1966) is a former Chinese badminton player.

Career 
Caiqin joined the Guangdong Badminton Team in 1981. Thereafter, she joined the national badminton team in 1989. In 1990 and 1991, she won the 13th Uber Cup Championship and the third place in the second Sudirman Cup. She had also won the Sports Medal of Honor. Lai throughout her career has medalled in prominent competitions such as Sudirman Cup, Uber Cup, World Cup & Asian Games. Most importantly, she won the 1990 World Cup Gold medal in Women's doubles. She also represented her country twice in World Championships in 1989 & 1991; both the times reaching Quarterfinal stage. She moved to Singapore after retiring from professional career and has since established a coaching academy through achieving notable results in inter-school tournaments (from Primary to Varsity levels).

Achievements

World Cup 
Women's doubles

Asian Games 
Women's doubles

IBF World Grand Prix 
The World Badminton Grand Prix sanctioned by International Badminton Federation (IBF) from 1983 to 2006.

Women's doubles

IBF International 
Women's doubles

References 

1966 births
Living people
Chinese female badminton players
Badminton players at the 1990 Asian Games
Asian Games bronze medalists for China
Asian Games gold medalists for China
Asian Games medalists in badminton
Medalists at the 1990 Asian Games
20th-century Chinese women